Robert Oliver Perrin (November 3, 1823October 8, 1878) was an American physician who served as president of the Greene County, Alabama Board of Health until his death in 1878. He previously served as a senior officer of the Confederate States Army, commanding a cavalry regiment in the Western Theater of the American Civil War until he resigned his commission in March 1865.

Notes

References

External links 

 
 Robert O. Perrin at The Civil War & Reconstruction Governors of Mississippi

1823 births
1878 deaths
11th Mississippi Cavalry Regiment
19th-century American physicians
American Civil War prisoners of war
American slave owners
Burials in Alabama
Cavalry commanders
Confederate States Army officers
County officials in Alabama
Disease-related deaths in Alabama
Farmers from Mississippi
Health officials
Military personnel from Mississippi
People from Edgefield County, South Carolina
People from Eutaw, Alabama
People from Kemper County, Mississippi
People of Mississippi in the American Civil War
Physicians from Alabama
Physicians from Mississippi